Pierre Frédéric Magnier (February 22, 1869 - October 15, 1959) was a French actor who began on the stage in the 1890s and became a prominent silent film actor in France. He was the second actor to portray Cyrano de Bergerac in any film in 1925. He continued acting until the 1950s. He is most remembered for the role of the General in Jean Renoir's La règle du jeu, where he has one of the films more poignant quotes (and the film's final line) when he praises Marcel Dalio's character as one of "a vanishing breed."

Selected filmography 
 Le Duel D'Hamlet with Sarah Bernhardt (1900)
 André Cornélis (1918)
La Roue (1923)
 Cyrano de Bergerac (1925)
 Tossing Ship (1932)
 Antoinette (1932)
 All for Love (1933)
 The Two Orphans (1933)
 Second Bureau (1935)
 Lady Killer (1937)
 The Lie of Nina Petrovna (1937)
 The Cheat (1937)
 The Ladies in the Green Hats (1937)
 Golden Venus (1938)
 Personal Column (1939)
 Coral Reefs (1939)
 Serenade (1940)
 Jeannou (1943)
 Mahlia the Mestiza (1943)
 Lessons in Conduct (1946)
 The Misfortunes of Sophie (1946)
 The Captain (1946)
Judicial Error (1948)
 The Murdered Model (1948)
 Ruy Blas (1948)
 Paris Still Sings (1951)
 Monsieur Leguignon, Signalman (1952)
 The Porter from Maxim's (1953)

External links

1869 births
1959 deaths
Male actors from Paris
French male stage actors
French male silent film actors
French male film actors
20th-century French male actors